Kralupy nad Vltavou is a town in Mělník District in the Central Bohemian Region of the Czech Republic. It has about 18,000 inhabitants. It is known as a traffic hub and industrial agglomeration.

Administrative parts
Town parts and villages of Lobeček, Mikovice, Minice and Zeměchy are administrative parts of Kralupy nad Vltavou.

Geography
It lies on the border between three geomorphological regions: Central Elbe Table in the northeast, Lower Eger Table in the northwest, and Prague Plateau in the south. The Vltava River flows through the town.

History
The first written reliable mention of Kralupy is from 1253. It was originally a village by the local ford. From its establishment to 1848, it was owned mostly by Knights of the Cross with the Red Star, except for four enforced short breaks. It had belonged to the same authority for six hundred years, which is a rare case.

When the importance of the Kralupy river ford ceased, the inhabitants mostly occupied themselves with farming. Growing and drying fruits had a tradition here. In 1851 the state railway line from Prague to Dresden was put into operation and in 1856 the Buštěhrad line with the reloading dock on the river Vltava opened. This laid the foundations of the Kralupy railway junction, which was extended in 1865 by the construction of the Kralupy–Turnov line. The development of the river shipping had led to the regulation of the Vltava in 1894. The railway and river transportation stimulated a rapid population growth and overall economic development Many enterprises were established and the price of land rose.

In 1854, the shipyard producing both wooden and metal vessels was founded and in 1857 the first real factory opened – a chemical factory called Jordánka, which employed 600 people in its heyday. In 1867, the steam-mill was put into operation, two sugar factories in 1868–1869, and a brewery opened in 1872. At the same time the first sand quarries and brickworks were opened. The general growth occurred, the mineral oil refinery was put into operation. This stage of the transformation of the village into a town culminated in 1881, when Kralupy was promoted to a market town, and in 1902, when it became a town. In 1902, the neighbouring settlement of Lobeč was joined to Kralupy and it changed its name to Kralupy nad Vltavou.

The World War I affected the town only indirectly. After the war, several new enterprises were established. The town suffered in the World War, when the oil campaign targeted the oil refinery in 1945. During the totalitarian communist rule (1948–89) the town lacked democratic municipal government.

The town's location is the cause of frequent devastating floods, which came in 1784, 1845 and 1890. The town centre was also damaged by the 2002 European floods.

Lobeček, Mikovice and Minice were separate municipalities until 1980, when they were incorporated into the town. Zeměchy was incorporated in 1986.

Demographics

Economy
Industry is the basis of the economy of Kralupy nad Vltavou, the chemical industry still has the tradition here. The oil refinery is owned by Orlen Unipetrol. It was destroyed in 1945 and put back into service only in 1975.

SYNTHOS Kralupy a.s. is the biggest company with its headquarters in Kralupy nad Vltavou. Until 1996, it was a part of the oil refinery company, and it is also owned by Unipetrol. Formerly known as KAUČUK, a.s., it is a chemical company founded 1954, focused on synthetic rubber and polystyrenes production.

The main representative of the food industry is Bidfood company. It is the largest food distributor in the Czech Republic and a producer of frozen food products.

Transport

The town is an important railway hub. The main line from Prague to Dresden runs through it as well as two other lines of lesser importance. The Vltava River is still used for transport.

Three bridges across the Vltava River are in the town – T. G. Masaryk Bridge (a highway bridge built in 1920s), a footbridge with bicycle lane (built in 1990s) and a railway bridge.

Sights

Kralupy nad Vltavou is poor in monuments. The landmark of the town centre is the Church of the Assumption of the Virgin Mary and Saint Wenceslaus. It was builr in the neo-Gothic style in 1894–1895. It represents one of the few preserved historical buildings in a town heavily disturbed by modern reconstruction and industrial production.

The Church of Saint James the Great is located in Minice. The originally Gothic church was rebuilt in the early Baroque style in 1668–1678.

The Church of the Nativity of Saint John the Baptist in Zeměchy is a Baroque church from 1723.

Notable people
Antonín Heveroch (1869–1927), psychiatrist and neurologist
Georges Kars (1880–1945), painter
Jindřich Bišický (1889–1949), war photographer
Jaroslav Seifert (1901–1986), poet, Nobel Prize winner; buried here
Alexander Kerst (1924–2010), actor
Lubomír Nácovský (1935–1982), sport shooter, Olympic medalist

Twin towns – sister cities

Kralupy nad Vltavou is twinned with:

 Banyuls-sur-Mer, France
 Hennigsdorf, Germany
 Hrádek nad Nisou, Czech Republic
 Komárno, Slovakia
 Miren-Kostanjevica, Slovenia
 Šabac, Serbia
 Środa Wielkopolska, Poland

Gallery

References

External links

Official tourist portal (in English and Czech)

Cities and towns in the Czech Republic
Populated riverside places in the Czech Republic